Chilchota Alimentos is a dairy company founded in 1968 in Gómez Palacio, Durango, Mexico by the Herrera Brothers.
It manufactures cheese, yogurt, cream, margarine, candies and juices.

The company is named after Chilchota, Michoacan,  the hometown of the father of its founders.

External links 
 Chilchota website.

References 

Dairy products companies of Mexico
Food and drink companies established in 1968
Mexican brands
1968 establishments in Mexico